Andrew Matthews Balding (born 29 December 1972) is a British racehorse trainer based at Park House Stables, Kingsclere, near Newbury, Berkshire.

Balding attended Caldicott School, a boys' preparatory school, and Radley College, a public school. He became a licensed trainer in January 2003, when he succeeded his father Ian Balding.

His elder sister is Clare Balding. His maternal grandfather was the trainer Peter Hastings-Bass and his maternal uncle William Hastings-Bass, 17th Earl of Huntingdon, former trainer to Queen Elizabeth II. His maternal grandmother Priscilla Hastings is descended from the Earls of Derby. His paternal grandfather was polo player Gerald Barnard Balding Sr.

Balding has been married to Anna-Lisa since 15 July 2005. They have two sons, Jonno and Toby, a daughter, Flora, and two boxer dogs, Georgia and Doris.

Notable horses trained by Balding include Casual Look, the winner of the Epsom Oaks in 2003. The win led to an emotional post-race interview with his sister.

In 2014, the Baldings' Park House Stables were visited by Irish president Michael D. Higgins as part of his state visit to the UK.

Major wins
 Great Britain
2000 Guineas - (1) - Kameko (2020)
British Champions Sprint Stakes - (1) - Donjuan Triumphant (2019)
Cheveley Park Stakes - (1) - Alcohol Free (2020)
Coronation Stakes - (1) - Alcohol Free (2021)
Dewhurst Stakes - (1) - Chaldean (2022)
Epsom Oaks - (1) - Casual Look (2003)
July Cup - (1) -  Alcohol Free (2022) 
Sussex Stakes - (2) - Here Comes When (2017), Alcohol Free (2021)
Vertem Futurity Trophy - (2) - Elm Park (2014), Kameko (2019)

 Canada
Canadian International Stakes - (1) - Phoenix Reach (2003)
E. P. Taylor Stakes - (1) - Blond Me (2017)

 Hong Kong
Hong Kong Vase - (1) - Phoenix Reach (2004)

 United Arab Emirates
Dubai Sheema Classic - (1) - Phoenix Reach (2005)

See also
List of significant families in British horse racing

References

External links
 Official website

1972 births
Living people
Sportspeople from London
British racehorse trainers
Andrew Balding
Hastings family
People from Kingsclere